Tory v. Cochran, 544 U.S. 734 (2005), is a United States Supreme Court case involving libel.

Background
The case began in California with Johnnie Cochran, the famed attorney who represented O. J. Simpson, suing his former client Ulysses Tory for libel and invasion of privacy. Cochran had withdrawn as Tory's lawyer in a civil rights suit nearly twenty years earlier, and in the late 1990s Tory began picketing Cochran's office, carrying signs that accused him of being a thief and of accepting bribes. A trial judge ruled that Tory had made false and defamatory statements about Cochran, and instead of awarding him damages, issued an injunction ordering Tory to never again display a sign or speak about Cochran.

Tory appealed, arguing that the order was a prior restraint that violated his First Amendment right to free speech. In an unpublished opinion, the California Court of Appeals ruled that the order was constitutional. The California Supreme Court declined to review the case, and on April 24, 2004, Tory filed a petition for a writ of certiorari with the U.S. Supreme Court. The petition was granted, briefing followed, and the oral argument took place on March 22, 2005. Cochran died seven days later and the court asked for further briefing.

Opinion of the Court
On May 31, 2005, the court ruled 7–2 that in light of Cochran's death, the injunction limiting the demonstrations of Ulysses Tory "amounts to an overly broad prior restraint upon speech". Two justices, Antonin Scalia and Clarence Thomas, said that Cochran's death made it unnecessary for the court to rule.

See also 
 List of United States Supreme Court cases, volume 544
 List of United States Supreme Court cases
 List of United States Supreme Court cases by the Rehnquist Court
 List of United States Supreme Court cases involving the First Amendment

External links 
 
 [ Tory v. Cochran Supreme Court docket]
 
 
 [ Supreme Court Oral Argument transcript]

United States Supreme Court cases
United States defamation case law
2005 in United States case law
United States Supreme Court cases of the Rehnquist Court